The 1996 Portland State Vikings football team was an American football team that represented Portland State University during the 1996 NCAA Division I-AA football season as a member of the Big Sky Conference. In their fourth year under head coach Tim Walsh, the team compiled a 3–8 record.

Schedule

References

Portland State
Portland State Vikings football seasons
Portland State Vikings football
Portland State Vikings football